Hugo van Wadenoyen (July 18, 1892 in Vlaardingen, Netherlands – March 1, 1959 in Cheltenham) was a British photographer, of Dutch origins. He lived in Cheltenham, England, and was an influential figure in the long drawn-out genesis of British fine art photography, especially between 1945 and 1965.

Biography 
Van Wadenoyen moved from the Netherlands to Cardiff, Wales in 1900, where his father would start a photographic studio.

Photography 
He became a Fellow of the Royal Photographic Society in 1919 at age twenty-six and in his early years took photographs in a Pictorialist style. In 1945, Van Wadenoyen led the "Combined Societies," a progressive group of local photographic societies (Hereford, Wolverhampton, and Bristol) that broke away from the moribund Royal Photographic Society.

He undertook a series of instructional books on photography, published by the Focal Press.

Van Wadenoyen's book Wayside Snapshots (Focal Press, 1947) marked a decisive British break with Pictorialism in photography, was a brave early attempt to use the book format as a means of showing a photographer's personal pictures.  Some of the book's fresh approaches to landscape strongly influenced Raymond Moore. Van Wadenoyen was also a mentor to Roger Mayne, involving Mayne in the Combined Societies group exhibitions between 1951 and 1955.

Works 

 Instructional books on photography published by Focal Press (circa 1940s), edited by Andor Kraszna-Krausz
 No. 4: All about PORTRAITS and Your Camera
 No. 7: All about LAND, SEA, SKY and Your Camera
 No. 9: All about DAYLIGHT INDOORS and Your Camera
 No. 13: All about ONE LAMP ONLY and Your Camera
 No. 14: All about THE SECOND LAMP and Your Camera
 No. 17: All about AGAINST THE SUN EFFECTS and Your Camera (1941)
 Photographing People: Ways to New Portraiture (London, New York: Focal Press, 1939)
 with John Holtan, Making an Enlarger from Functional Plans (London: Focal Press, 1960? 2nd ed.)

References

Wadenoyen, Hugo van
1959 deaths
1892 births
People from Cheltenham
20th-century British photographers
Dutch emigrants to the United Kingdom